Cazombo is a town with a population of 34,000 (2014), and the municipal seat of Alto Zambeze located in the Moxico province in Angola. It is on the east bank of the Zambezi River.

Transport 
Cazombo is served by Cazombo Airport located on the eastern outskirts of the town.

See also 

 Communes of Angola

References 

Populated places in Moxico Province